Roger (died 1102) was a medieval Bishop of Hereford-elect.

Roger was the larderer for King Henry I of England before he was appointed to the see of Hereford in September 1102. He was invested with the bishopric on 29 September 1102, by King Henry I of England. He then attended the Council of London held just days later. He became ill, and asked Anselm, the Archbishop of Canterbury to consecrate him before his death, but Anselm refused as the archbishop had already compromised with the king over the Investiture Crisis by allowing the king to invest Roger. He died at the council within a week of his investiture.

Citations

References

 
 

Bishops of Hereford
1102 deaths
Anglo-Normans
Year of birth unknown
12th-century English Roman Catholic bishops